Issoufou Sellsavon Dayo (born 6 August 1991) is a Burkinabé professional footballer who plays as a centre-back for RS Berkane and the Burkina Faso national team. Issoufou Dayo featured in the AFCON 2021 third place game against Cameroon.

Club career
Dayo played for RC Bobo Dioulasso and Étoile Filante de Ouagadougou in Benin, then for AS Vita Club in Congo DR, before joining RS Berkane in Morocco. On 25 October 2020, he scored the winning goal for RS Berkane in a 1–0 victory over Egyptian club Pyramids FC in the 2020 CAF Confederation Cup Final.

International career
In January 2014, coach Brama Traore, invited him to be a part of the Burkina Faso squad for the 2014 African Nations Championship. The team was eliminated in the group stages after losing to Uganda and Zimbabwe and then drawing with Morocco.
He was part of the squad in the 2017 Africa Cup of Nations which is his first African cup. In the team's first game he scored a 75th-minute equalizer to gain a point for his nation. This is to date his only goal for his country.

Career statistics
Scores and results list Burkina Faso's goal tally first, score column indicates score after each Dayo goal.

Honours
Étoile Filante de Ouagadougou
 Burkinabé Premier League: 2013–14

AS Vita Club 
 Linafoot: 2014–15

RS Berkane 
 Moroccan Throne Cup: 2018
CAF Confederation Cup: 2019–20, 2021–22
CAF Super Cup: 2022

Individual

 Best Botola Foreign Player of the Season: 2021–22

References

1991 births
Living people
Burkinabé footballers
People from Bobo-Dioulasso
21st-century Burkinabé people
Burkina Faso international footballers
Association football central defenders
Burkina Faso A' international footballers
2014 African Nations Championship players
2017 Africa Cup of Nations players
2021 Africa Cup of Nations players
Étoile Filante de Ouagadougou players
RS Berkane players
Burkinabé expatriate footballers
Burkinabé expatriate sportspeople in the Democratic Republic of the Congo
Expatriate footballers in the Democratic Republic of the Congo
Burkinabé expatriate sportspeople in Morocco
Expatriate footballers in Morocco